Worlds Beyond or Beyond the World or variation, may refer to:

 World Beyond, a 2018 album by British synthpop band Erasure
 A World Beyond (2015 film) U.S. science-fantasy film
 Of Worlds Beyond (1947 book), anthology of essays on techniques of writing science fiction
 PokéPark Wii 2: Beyond The World (2011 video game) Nintendo Wii Pokémon videogame
 Worlds Beyond (magazine) (1950-1951 magazine) U.S. science fiction and fantasy pulp fiction magazine
 Worlds Beyond (role-playing game), a 1990 release sci-fi space adventure game

Television
 The World Beyond (1978 TV episode) U.S. supernatural drama
 Worlds Beyond (TV series) (1986-1988), UK supernatural documentary TV show
 The Walking Dead: World Beyond

See also

 Beyond (disambiguation)
 Tomorrowland (disambiguation)
 World (disambiguation)